Bapatla railway station (station code:BPP) is an Indian Railways station in Bapatla of Andhra Pradesh. It lies on the Vijayawada–Gudur section and is administered under Vijayawada railway division of South Coast Railway zone.

Classification 
In terms of earnings and outward passengers handled, Bapatla is categorized as a Non-Suburban Grade-5 (NSG-5) railway station. Based on the re–categorization of Indian Railway stations for the period of 2017–18 and 2022–23, an NSG–5 category station earns between – crore and handles  passengers.

Station amenities 

Bapatla is one of the 38 stations in the division to be equipped with Automatic Ticket Vending Machines (ATVMs).

References 

Vijayawada railway division
Railway stations in Guntur district